Slavoňov is a municipality and village in Náchod District in the Hradec Králové Region of the Czech Republic. It has about 300 inhabitants.

Administrative parts
The village of Blažkov is an administrative part of Slavoňov.

References

Villages in Náchod District